The Xinxiang–Yanzhou railway or Xinyan railway, is a railroad in northern China between Xinxiang in Henan Province and Yanzhou in Shandong Province.  The line,  in length and built in sections from 1911–1912, 1979–1980 and 1983–1985, serves as a major conduit for the shipment of coal from Shanxi Province.  Major cities and towns along route include Xinxiang, Heze, Jining and Yanzhou.

History
The Xinxiang–Yanzhou  railway was built in sections over three periods from 1911 to 1985.  The Yanzhou-Jining section,  in length, was built from 1911 to 1912 as a branch off of the Jinpu railway.  This section was demolished in 1944 by Japanese occupying forces during World War II and rebuilt in 1958.  The Jining-Heze section,  in length, was built from 1979 to 1980.  The Xinxiang-Heze section,  in length, was built from 1983 to 1985.  The Xinyan and the Yanzhou–Shijiusuo railway form a major conduit for the shipment of coal from Shanxi to the East China Sea.  Collectively, these two railways are sometimes referred to as the Xinxiang–Shijiusuo or Xinxiang–Heze–Yanzhou–Rizhao railway.

Rail connections
Xinxiang: Beijing–Guangzhou railway, Xinxiang–Yueshan railway
Heze: Beijing–Kowloon railway
Yanzhou: Beijing–Shanghai railway, Yanzhou–Shijiusuo railway

See also

 List of railways in China

References

Railway lines in China
Rail transport in Henan
Rail transport in Shandong